Atilla Engin (1946-2019) was a Turkish American fusion jazz drummer. From 1974 to 2001 he was active in Denmark as a musician and educator; he organized music festivals and represented Denmark as a musical ambassador. In 2001, he left Denmark for the United States, where he formed an orchestra.

Biography

 

Engin first played and recorded in Istanbul, moving to Copenhagen in 1974, and playing with several groups. He released his first album Turkish Delight with the band Matao. They performed at Roskilde Festival in 1979. His other group, Atilla Engin Group, released five albums. While he was recording and touring with his band, he taught at the Copenhagen Jazz Conservatory for four years. Engin formed a band with 12 Copenhagen Jazz Conservatory students and they toured Turkey.

In 1985 Engin was awarded Composer of the Year in Denmark. In the same year, the Atilla Engin Group was appointed Denmark's cultural ambassador to represent the country in conjunction with the European Music Year 1985.

Engin established the World to World Drums and Percussion Festival in Copenhagen with events taking place in Aarhus and Malmö, Sweden. The festival included performances by Zakir Hussain, Airto Moreira, Nana Vasconcelos, Peter Giger, and Danny Gottlieb. He participated in Tal Vadhya Utsav in India.

He taught an evening class of 16 young musicians at the Rhythmic Evening School in Copenhagen in 1984, turning them into a band named Tyrkis which performed at Jazzhus Montmartre in Copenhagen. In 1987, Tyrkis won first prize at the Dortmunder Big Band Festival in Germany and released an album, My Little Chinese Love.

He left Denmark in 1989 for New York and formed the New World Orchestra and a six-piece group, Turquoise. Engin left the US for Brazil in 2005.

In 2010 he was diagnosed with cerebral haemorrhage, and sat in a wheelchair unable to speak. Atilla Engin died in Brazil the 2nd November 2019.

His bands

Copenhagen 1977–89

New York 1992–2002

Discography 
 Felek Usta  (Evren, 1971)
 Kumsalda (Yonca, 1974) Vocals: Özdemir Erdoğan (Lyrics, music, arrangement, drums, piano: Atilla Engin
 Bütün İçkiler Benden Bu Gece (Yonca, 1974) Vocals: Alpay (Lyrics, music, arrangement: Atilla Engin)
 Turkish Delight, Group Matao (RA, 1979)
 Atatürk's Children and Nasrettin Hoca (Fairytale, 1980)
 Solens Børn with Ariel(19),  (Pick Up, 1980)
 Nazar (Danish Music Productions, 1982)
 Memories, Atilla Engin Group (including Okay Temiz on percussion, Hugo Rasmussen on bass, Jens Winther on trumpet)  (Danish Music Productions, 1984)
 Marmaris Love with Okay Temiz  (Danish Music Productions, 1986)
 No Money No Honey with Arto Tunçboyacıyan) (Danish Music Productions)
 My Little Chinese Love, Tyrkis Big Band conducted by Atilla Engin (Stunt)
 Melo Perquana, Atilla Engin Group with Niels-Henning Ørsted Pedersen) (Olufsen, 1988)
 Mosaic of Anatolia, Group Turquoise (Istanbul, 1999)
 Moon Dog Girl by the Noodle Shop (John Kruth, Elliott Sharp, Atilla Engin and Jonathan Segel)  (Sparkling Beatnik, 1999)
 Ocean of Emotion, The İstanbul Orchestra – Group Turquoise (2009)

References

External links 

Official site

1946 births
2019 deaths
20th-century American drummers
American jazz composers
American jazz drummers
American male drummers
Deaths from cerebrovascular disease
Jazz arrangers
Jazz fusion drummers
Jazz fusion percussionists
American male jazz composers
People from Kayseri
Turkish emigrants to the United States
Turkish jazz drummers
American world music musicians
20th-century American male musicians
Olufsen Records artists